Gigarimaneta samsoni is a species of epifaunal Petalonamid from the Ediacaran deposits of the Canadian Mistaken Point Formation. G. samsoni grew is a similar manner to Fractofusus and/or Beothukis and grew slightly into the substrate.

Gigarimaneta was roughly round and composed of multiple rows of allantoid-like units that further sub-divided into smaller spherocylindrical units but they do not show the signature fractal branching of related fronds however the many divisions in the units of the organism are thought to represent invaginations of the a presumed lower epithelium that increased the surface-are - volume ratio without branching glide symmetry. These divisions from the units probably allowed the taxon to gain a great number of nutrients from the substrate underneath it by culturing the sulfur-oxidizing bacteria; a way of life similar to Chemosynthetic phagotrophy.

See also 
Petalonamae
List of Ediacaran genera
Hapsidophyllas

References 

Ediacaran
Ediacaran life
Taxa described in 2021
Petalonamae
Enigmatic prehistoric animal genera
Prehistoric animal genera